Jihuli is a village in the East Champaran district of Bihar, India.

Jihuli is one of 37 villages in Patahi Block. Villagers speak Vajjika, Hindi, and Urdu, though Vajjika is the local language.ihuli is one of the villages in Patahi Block in Purvi Champaran district of Bihar. The total population of the village is 9328 . The literacy rate is 38.26% . The female literacy rate is 31.03% . The male literacy rate is 44.75%. The number of households in Jihuli is 1,287. Female to male ratio of Jihuli is 91.85%. Female to male ratio of the village is less than state's female to male ratio 91.93%. It is unsatisfactory and the people should drive some campaign to improve this. The total working population is 36.66% of the total population. 60.44% of the men are working population . 10.14% of the women are working population. The main working population is 33.55% of the total population. 58.35% of the men are main working population . 5.89% of the women are main working population. While the marginal working population is 3.11% of the total population. 2.09% of the men are marginal working population. 4.25% of the women are marginal working population. The total non working population is 63.34% of the total population. 39.56% of the men are non working population. 89.86% of the women are non working population.
Jihuli is a Big village and has a high school,4 middle school and 14small gov school. It has Bus connectivity to district head quarter. Main Occupation of the village is farming.

Industry
Agriculture is the village's major industry. People buy and sell commodities at the Jihuli Bazaar. Another nearby market is called the Pachpakri Bazaar.

Governance
The village elects Mukhiya and Sarpanch to solve village disputes.

Temples
There are many temples in the village, such as Hanuman Mandir(Sarkar Gachi),Hanuman Mandir(shekahi Tola),Ram Janki Mandir(Badka Math),Panchmukhi Mahavir Mandir, Maharani Asthan, Shiv Mandir, and Sapahi Devi.

Panchmukhi Mahavir Mandir

Some Images of the temple Panchmukhi Mahavir Mandir -

Temple God

Schools
There are many primary schools, 2 middle and 1 high school.

Festivals
Villagers celebrate festivals like Durga Puja, Mahaviri Jhanda and Chhath.

References

Villages in East Champaran district